Nowakiidae is an extinct family of free-living animals from Subclass Nowakiida.

References 

 Daten zur stratigraphischen Verbreitung der Nowakiidae (Dacryoconarida) im Devon von NW-Afrika (Marokko, Algerien). GKB Alberti, Senckenbergiana lethaea, 1981
 Unterdevonische Nowakiidae (Dacryoconarida) aus dem Rheinischen Schiefergebirge, aus Oberfranken und aus N-Afrika (Algerien, Marokko). GKB Alberti, Senckenbergiana lethaea, 1983
 Nowakiidae (Dacryoconarida) aus dem Hunsrückschiefer von Bundenbach (Rheinisches Schiefergebirge). GKB Alberti, Senckenbergiana lethaea, 1982

External links 
 Nowakiidae at fossilworks

Tentaculita
Devonian animals
Devonian first appearances
Devonian extinctions